The 1997 World Snooker Championship (also referred to as the 1997 Embassy World Snooker Championship for the purposes of sponsorship) was a professional ranking snooker tournament that took place between 19 April and 5 May 1997. Staged at the Crucible Theatre in Sheffield, England, the tournament was sponsored by cigarette manufacturer Embassy.

Ken Doherty won the only world title of his professional career by defeating the defending champion Stephen Hendry 18–12 in the final. The first player to win world championships at junior, amateur, and professional level, Doherty became the second player from outside the United Kingdom to win the title in the modern era, following Cliff Thorburn in 1980. Doherty remains the only world champion from the Republic of Ireland. Hendry's defeat in the final was his first loss in the World Championship since 1991, which ended his record 29 consecutive Crucible victories.

Tournament summary
 The semi-final matches were best of 33 for the first time, having previously been best of 31. 
 Ronnie O'Sullivan made the quickest maximum break in history with a time of 5 minutes and 8 seconds, and the fourth in the history of the tournament.
 Terry Griffiths' first round encounter against Mark Williams was his last ever professional match. This match was also three time World Champion Williams' Crucible debut. 
Other debutants this year were Bradley Jones (England); Graham Horne; David McLellan and future World Champion and twice runner-up Graeme Dott (all Scotland); Lee Walker and Dominic Dale (Wales). All these players lost in the first round except Dale and Walker, who reached the last-16 and quarter finals respectively. This meant that all three Welsh debutants won their first round matches.
Alain Robidoux had his best run at the World Championship (or any ranking event), reaching the semi-finals. The Canadian player lost 7–17 to Ken Doherty.
James Wattana reached the semi finals for the second time (after 1993) but the Thai player lost 13–17 to defending champion Stephen Hendry.
 Hendry's five-year run as World Champion came to an end after losing to Doherty 12–18. It was Hendry's first defeat at the World Championship since 1991, spanning 29 matches, a Crucible record.
Doherty became only the second player from outside the United Kingdom to win the world title in the modern era, following Cliff Thorburn in 1980.
 Alan Chamberlain refereed his first and only World Championship final. He was the first referee since Jim Thorpe in 1984 to officiate a debut final. All finals up to this year were officiated by either John Williams, Len Ganley or John Street. The next four years also had referees debuting the final: Lawrie Annandale in 1998, Colin Brinded in 1999, John Newton in 2000 and Eirian Williams in 2001, before John Williams did his 10th final in 2002.

Prize fund
The breakdown of prize money for this year is shown below:
Winner:  £210,000
Runner-up:  £126,000
Semi-finalist:  £63,000
Quarter-finalist:  £31,500
Last 16:  £16,800
Last 32:  £9,450
Highest break: £18,000
Maximum break: £147,000
Total  £1,260,000

Main draw 
Shown below are the results for each round. The numbers in parentheses beside some of the players are their seeding ranks (each championship has 16 seeds and 16 qualifiers).

Century breaks
There were 39 century breaks in this year's championship.

 147, 133  Ronnie O'Sullivan
 137, 122, 117, 114, 110, 106, 106, 101, 101  Stephen Hendry
 134, 130, 111, 101  John Higgins
 133, 129, 129, 102  John Parrott
 131  Billy Snaddon
 129, 121, 117  Anthony Hamilton
 128, 121, 116, 108  Darren Morgan
 127  Stefan Mazrocis

 125  Jimmy White
 123  Mark Williams
 121, 113  Alain Robidoux
 116, 104, 101  Ken Doherty
 112  James Wattana
 110  Dominic Dale
 100  Stephen Lee
 100  Alan McManus

Qualifying 

The qualifying matches were held between 2 January and March 1997 at the Newport Centre in Newport, Wales. The last round was played at Telford International Centre, Telford on 24 and 25 March 1997.

Round 2–3

References

1997
World Championship
World Snooker Championship
Sports competitions in Sheffield
April 1997 sports events in the United Kingdom
May 1997 sports events in the United Kingdom